Glenn A. Johnson was an American football, basketball, baseball and track coach and college athletics administrator.

Johnson was a collegiate athletic at Indiana University in Bloomington, Indiana, lettering in basketball in 1921.

He served as the head football coach at Hartwick College in Oneonta, New York from 1935 to 1939,  Mansfield University of Pennsylvania in 1940, Bethany College in Bethany, West Virginia from 1948 to 1950, and Rhodes College (then known as Southwestern College) in Memphis, Tennessee from 1951 to 1953.

Johnson was also instrumental in establishing the Hoosier College Conference in 1947 while serving as the athletic director at Canterbury College in Danville, Indiana.

Head coaching record

College football

References

Year of birth missing
Year of death missing
American men's basketball players
Bethany Bison football coaches
Bethany Bison men's basketball coaches
Canterbury Knights athletic directors
Canterbury Knights basketball coaches
Canterbury Knights football coaches
Indiana Hoosiers football players
Indiana Hoosiers men's basketball players
Hartwick Hawks athletic directors
Hartwick Hawks baseball coaches
Hartwick Hawks football coaches
Hartwick Hawks men's basketball coaches
Huntington Foresters football coaches
Huntington Foresters men's basketball coaches
Mansfield Mounties football coaches
Mansfield Mountaineers men's basketball coaches
Memphis Tigers track and field coaches
Rhodes Lynx athletic directors
Rhodes Lynx baseball coaches
Rhodes Lynx football coaches
Rhodes Lynx men's basketball coaches
High school basketball coaches in Indiana
High school football coaches in Indiana
High school football coaches in New York (state)